Khvoyny is a rural locality (a settlement) in Khvoynensky Selsoviet of Zeysky District, Amur Oblast, Russia. The population was 225 as of 2018. There are 11 streets.

Geography 
Khvoyny is located on the west bank of the Zeya Reservoir, 347 km northeast of Zeya (the district's administrative centre) by road. Im. Generala Milko is the nearest rural locality.

References 

Rural localities in Zeysky District